Colbert Searles (August 15, 1873 – January 15, 1947) was an American football coach. He served as the head football coach at the University of Arkansas from 1899 to 1900. He was also a professor of Romance languages at the university during his tenure.

Head coaching record

References

External links
 

1873 births
1947 deaths
Arkansas Razorbacks football coaches
University of Arkansas faculty
People from Wilton, Maine
Sports coaches from Minneapolis